Råshult is a village just north of Älmhult in Kronoberg County, Småland, Sweden. It is notable as the birthplace of the seminal biologist and "father of modern taxonomy", Carl Linnaeus (1707–1778).

References

External links 
 

Listed buildings in Sweden
Populated places in Kronoberg County
Populated places in Älmhult Municipality
Carl Linnaeus